Rosalie Dreyer (3 September 1895 – 21 May 1987) was a Swiss-born naturalised British nurse and administrator. Immigrating to England at the age of eighteen, she trained as a nurse in London and worked her way through the ranks to become matron, principal matron and chief matron-in-charge of the Nursing Service of the London County Council. At this time, nursing was making a shift from a voluntary service to a profession and Dreyer was involved as a pioneer in the development of Britain's public-funded nursing service.

Early life
Rosalie Dreyer was born on 3 September 1895 in Bern, Switzerland to Elisabeth (née Neuenschwander) and Johann Dreyer. She was the oldest of four daughters and her father managed a dairy co-operative. Though Lutheran, after receiving her basic education from a school run by Catholic nuns, Dreyer traveled to England in 1914 as a nanny to a Swiss family who had settled abroad. She entered nurses training in 1918 at Guy's Hospital of London and earned her state registration certificate in 1922.

Career
After her graduation, Dreyer worked for a year as private nurse before returning to Switzerland in 1923 to work at the Rollier Clinic, a tubercular hospital in Leysin. She returned to England in 1924 and resumed work at Guy's Hospital, while studying for her midwifery certification, which she attained in 1926. She was appointed as assistant matron at Guy's in 1931 and three years later, became the matron at Bethnal Green Hospital, which was overseen by the London County Council (LCC). In 1934, Dreyer became a naturalized British citizen. The following year, she was promoted to principal matron at Bethnal Green, become responsible for nursing administration. In 1940, after the previous Principal matron-in-charge, Dorothy Bannon died, Dreyer took over the post with the approval of the LCC. As this was at the beginning of World War II, there was a xenophobic movement to dismiss her, which the LCC rejected, reconfirming the appointment. During the war, she visited hospitals which had been bombed during The Blitz and assessed which should be evacuated. If she determined that a facility must be abandoned, she organized the removal and eventual return of patients, nurses and equipment.

The LCC did not contract nurses for specific facilities, but rather, contracted nurses to their centralized system, giving Dreyer charge of all 11,000 nurses under contract to the LCC. During her tenure, Dreyer managed the often difficult process of improving the status and professionalism of the nursing profession without becoming aligned with the politics of her employers. She also had to assess the sometimes conflicting priorities of adequate training verses adequate staff. As prior to World War II, nurses had predominantly been volunteers, training, equipment, and facilities varied widely in the hospitals within the LCC supervision. During the war, with the increased need for staff, Dreyer had to make difficult decisions as to whether training or serving the public was the imperative.

In 1948, Dreyer was appointed as Chief Nursing Officer and supervised the merger of LCC Nursing Service into the new National Health Service (NHS). She was the first president of the National Association of State Enrolled Nurses. After two years, she left the NHS, but continued to serve on the management committee for South West Middlesex Hospital (1950–1958) and went to work for the World Health Organization (WHO). Serving as a nursing adviser, she toured European countries which had been afflicted by the war and advised the organization on reconstructing nursing in those areas. In 1952, she began working on the management committee of Stepney Hospital, part of the NHS, and the following year, she retired from the WHO. In 1955, she also began work on the management board of Lewisham Hospital. Resigning from her managerial duties at South West Middlesex in 1958, she continued to work with Stepney and Lewisham until 1964.

Death and legacy
Dreyer died from a brain tumor on 21 May 1987 at her home in Wimbledon, London. She is noted, along with her predecessor, Bannon, as a pioneer in creating the public-funded nursing service in Britain.

References

Citations

Bibliography

1895 births
1987 deaths
People from Bern
British nurses
Swiss nurses
Swiss emigrants to the United Kingdom
Naturalised citizens of the United Kingdom